Henry Herbert, 1st Baron Herbert of Chirbury (24 July 1654 – 22 January 1709) was an English politician who sat in the House of Commons at various times between 1677 and 1694 when he became Baron Herbert of Chirbury.

Herbert was the son of Sir Henry Herbert, Master of Revels to Charles I and Charles II. He inherited the manor of Ribbesford (near Bewdley) on the death of his father.  Like his father he served as Member of Parliament for Bewdley, from 1677 to 1679, for Worcester in Charles II's last Parliament and again for Bewdley from 1689 to 1694.  In the latter year, the title Baron Herbert of Chirbury, which had become extinct on the death of his cousin Henry Herbert, 4th Baron Herbert of Chirbury in 1691, was revived for him.

He was involved in the passage of the Act for better Securing the Duties of East India Goods, which extended the monopoly of the London-based East India Company across Scotland thus encompassing the whole of the new Kingdom of Great Britain

References
 
 
 'Parishes: Ribbesford with the borough of Bewdley', Victoria County History, Worcester 4 (1924), pp. 297–317. . Date accessed: 28 March 2008

1654 births
1709 deaths
Henry Herbert, 01st Baron Herbert of Chirbury
Barons Herbert of Chirbury (second creation)
Peers of England created by William III
Herbert, Henry
People from Bewdley
English MPs 1661–1679
English MPs 1681
English MPs 1689–1690
English MPs 1690–1695